Sherlock Holmes and the Voice of Terror is a 1942 American mystery thriller film based on Sir Arthur Conan Doyle's Sherlock Holmes detective stories. The film combines elements of Doyle's short story "His Last Bow", to which it is credited as an adaptation, and the real-life activities of Lord Haw-Haw.

Directed by John Rawlins, Sherlock Holmes and the Voice of Terror is the third of fourteen films starring Basil Rathbone as Holmes and Nigel Bruce as Dr. John Watson. It is the first film in the series to be released by Universal Pictures and the first to be set in contemporaneous times.

Plot 

The film begins with a title card describing Holmes and Watson as "ageless", as an explanation as to why the film is set in the 1940s rather than Holmes' era of 1881–1914, as the preceding 20th Century Fox films were. There is a nod to the classic Holmes, in a scene where Holmes and Watson are leaving 221B Baker Street, and Holmes picks up his deerstalker. Watson protests, and Holmes reluctantly puts on a fedora instead.

Holmes is called into the "Inner Council" of British Intelligence by Sir Evan Barham (Reginald Denny), to assist in stopping Nazi saboteurs operating in Britain, whose activities are announced in advance in radio broadcasts by  "The Voice of Terror".

Gavin (Robert Barron), one of Holmes's operatives, is killed with a German dagger in his back. Before he dies, Gavin utters the word "Christopher." Later, Holmes and Watson go to the Limehouse district of London, where they meet with Gavin's wife Kitty (Evelyn Ankers).

Holmes tells the council that, through the use of an oscilloscope to carefully analyze and compare sound wave patterns from radio broadcasts of live vs. pre-recorded voices, he has determined that "The Voice of Terror" is actually recorded on phonograph records in the United Kingdom, but broadcast from Germany. Using a tip from Kitty, Holmes and Watson go to the old Christopher Docks, where they are followed by Sir Anthony Lloyd (Henry Daniell) of the council. The three men are captured by a group of Nazi spies led by Meade (Thomas Gomez) however Sherlock, Watson & Lloyd are freed by some of the East End men as they attack the Nazis, although Meade manages to escape through a trap door to a waiting speedboat.

Kitty pretends to be a thief on the run and joins Meade. She finds out that Meade plans to go to Sir Evan's country estate that night. There Holmes and Sir Evan watch a German plane attempt to land, but gunshots fired by Sir Evan disrupt the Nazi rendezvous; all the while Meade hides in the dark.

After one of Holmes informants traces Meade and Kitty to the south coast of England, Holmes forces the council to go there with him. With the support of British troopers, Holmes captures Meade and a group of German soldiers stationed in an abandoned church.

There he reveals the true identity of "The Voice of Terror" as Sir Evan Barham, who happens to be an impostor. Holmes then reveals that in World War I, the real Barham was a prisoner in a German war camp and had an uncanny resemblance to a Heinrich Von Bock, a member of the German Secret Service; one day the real Barham was taken out and executed; the gentleman who called Holmes into the case was Von Bock himself who had been posing as Barham for 24 years; Holmes then adds that Barham had no immediate family, so his private life was well studied by Von Bock, who also studied at Oxford and had knowledge of English language and manners. So, with a little help of plastic surgery, not to mention the resemblance to Barham in the first place, the deception was carried out thoroughly. Holmes also concludes that the real Sir Evan Barham carried a scar from childhood, the one Von Bock carried from plastic surgery was approximately 20 years old – the clue that gave away the fact that he was an impostor.

Holmes then informs the spies that the German invasion force has been destroyed. The angry Meade shoots and fatally wounds Kitty, but is killed himself as he attempts to escape. The Council stand around the murdered Kitty and swear that her heroic death will not be in vain.

The film ends with a direct quote from "His Last Bow":

Watson: It's a lovely morning, Holmes.
Holmes: There's an east wind coming, Watson.
Watson: I don't think so. Looks like another warm day.
Holmes: Good old Watson. The one fixed point in a changing age. There's an east wind coming all the same. Such a wind as never blew on England yet. It will be cold and bitter, Watson, and a good many of us may wither before its blast. But it's God's own wind none the less. And a greener, better, stronger land will lie in the sunshine when the storm is cleared.

Cast 
Cast adapted from the book Universal Horrors.

Background and production
The late 1930s and early 1940s were described by the authors of the book Universal Horrors as "the true heyday of the detective film"; they noted that nearly every studio had at least one series based on a popular fictional detective. Universal Pictures had been producing mystery films for a long time but had not truly produced any detective films. 20th Century-Fox wanted to exercise their options on a Sherlock Holmes film, but negotiations with The Conan Doyle estate became unfruitful when the estate insisted that all future scripts must remain faithful to the original material opposed to building new adventures for the detective. Shortly after this, Warner Bros. displayed an interest in adapting "The Speckled Band" with Rathbone and Bruce as Sherlock Holmes and Dr. Watson respectively. This film was not made per a notice in the Hollywood Reporter claiming there were "difficulties encountered in clearing all rights in the complicated copyright setup covering Holmes yarns." The Hollywood Reporter reported that writer Bob Jackson was originally assigned to write the screenplay for this production, but his contribution to the released film has not been determined.

In early 1942, Universal entered into a contract with the estate, and agreed to pay $300,000 for the screen rights to the character. According to the author of Universal Horrors, with the exception of MGM's The Thin Man series, detective films were usually relegated to be second features with The Sherlock Holmes series being given average budgets and less hectic production schedules.  Filming began on May 5, 1942, under the title Sherlock Holmes Saves London.  The film was directed by John Rawlins, the only of Universal's Sherlock Holmes films that wasn't directed by Roy William Neill.

Release
Sherlock Holmes and the Voice of Terror was released on September 18, 1942. It was distributed by Universal Pictures Company, Inc.

Reception
From contemporary reviews, critics Kate Cameron of The Hollywood Reporter and Eileen Creelman of The New York Sun complimented the cinematography while Archer Winsten of The New York Post and Kate Cameron of The New York Daily News praised Rathbone and Bruce in their roles. The Film Daily commented on the overall quality of the film stating that "Though routine and undistinguished, the melodrama [...] has a fair amount of thrilling action and much speed [...] The acting is generally good." Winsten commented on the films contemporary setting, concluding that "It is to be feared that neither the Holmes series nor the war effort are greatly aided by this ambitious but uneffective attempt to merge the two."

References

Sources

External links 
 
 
 
 
 Sherlock Holmes and the Voice of Terror on Basil Rathbone and Nigel Bruce fan site

1942 films
1942 mystery films
American mystery films
American black-and-white films
Films based on short fiction
American detective films
Sherlock Holmes films based on works by Arthur Conan Doyle
Universal Pictures films
Films directed by John Rawlins
World War II films made in wartime
Films scored by Frank Skinner
Films set in London
1940s English-language films